"99 Ways to Die" is a song by the American thrash metal band Megadeth. The song was recorded for the soundtrack to The Beavis and Butt-head Experience, and was released as a single and a music video. The song was nominated in the "Best Metal Performance" category at the 1995 Grammy Awards.

Background 
"99 Ways to Die", like many other Megadeth songs, is about band frontman Dave Mustaine's ex fiance, Diana.

The song has rarely been performed live by Megadeth, with it only appearing live a handful of times in 1995. Mustaine played the song for the first time in over 20 years at the "Rock 'N' Roll Fantasy Camp" in Deerfield Beach, Florida, in January, 2022. The song was performed with some campers as well as Brittany Denaro (AKA Britt Lightning), guitarist for the band Vixen.

Critical reception 
The "Hidden Treasures" received generally mediocre reviews from critics, with "99 Ways to Die" being one of the only songs received well. AllMusics Stephen Thomas Erlewine wrote that the EP does not have many "first-rate songs" and that only "99 Ways to Die" made an impression. The Rolling Stone Album Guide was dismissive of the EP; the staff reviewer commented that the album is worth hearing only for "99 Ways to Die".

 Track listing 
All credits adapted from CD single.

 Charts 

 Personnel 
Credits are adapted from "Hidden Treasures" liner notes and "99 Ways to Die" CD.MegadethDave Mustaine – guitars, lead vocals
David Ellefson – bass, backing vocals
Marty Friedman – guitars, backing vocals
Nick Menza – drumsProduction'

Production - Max Norman and Dave Mustaine
Executive production - Mike Judge and Tony Berg
Engineering - Max Norman 
Mixing: Max Norman and Dave Mustaine
Musical supervision - John Cannelli
Guitar/bass/amplifier technician - Michael Kaye
Drum technician - Bruce Jacoby

References 

1993 songs
1993 singles
Megadeth songs
Songs written by Dave Mustaine